WZOL (98.3 FM), branded on-air as Radio Sol 98.3, is a radio station licensed to San Juan, Puerto Rico. The station is currently owned by The Seventh-Day Avdentists of Eastern Puerto Rico Association & its licensee is Radio Sol 92, WZOL, Inc. WZOL is simulcasting on WZOL-FM3, licensed to Fajardo, Puerto Rico, and W227CV 93.3 FM licensed to San Lorenzo, Puerto Rico, United States.

Translator stations

See also 
 WTPM (FM): Seventh-Day Adventist radio station in Aguadilla, Puerto Rico,

References

External links
Radio Sol 98.3 FM Facebook
 
 

ZOL
ZOL
Radio stations established in 1978
1978 establishments in Puerto Rico
Seventh-day Adventist media
Seventh-day Adventist Church in North America